Seta Hagopian (born July 28, 1950, in Basra, Iraq) is an Iraqi singer of Armenian origin. Her singing career began in 1968 which led to much success for she is known to be the "Warm voice of Iraq" and has been dubbed as Iraq's Fairouz.

Early career

Born in Basra, Iraq, to a family of Christian Iraqi Armenians. Her father was a tennis player who represented Iraq in numerous tournaments. Soon after Hagopian's career had begun, she was working with the most prominent composers such as Tariq al-Shibli, Farouk Hilal Khammash, Elias Rahbani and Ahmed Qasim.

Hagopian's style of music was one of the first to renew Iraqi songs through the introduction of Western instruments along with singing contemporary pop music. She has held concerts across the entire Arab world, including Iraq, Egypt, Algeria, the United Arab Emirates, Qatar as well as across Europe in Uzbekistan, Russia, Germany, Bulgaria and Spain.

Hagopian left Iraq to settle in Qatar in 1997. She currently resides in Toronto- Canada.

Personal life
She is married to director Emad Bahjat; they both live together in Qatar. Hagopian is mother to two daughters, Nova and Naire. Nova Emad is a singer who currently resides in Canada and is following in her mother's footsteps in renewing the classical Iraqi music by infusing it with new genres, like hip hop/trance and Bossa-Nova. Naire is an editor, director and a photographer.

References

External links

 Official Website
Seta Hagopian at Facebook
 SoundCloud
 at Instagram

1950 births
People from Basra
Living people
Iraqi people of Armenian descent
Iraqi Christians
20th-century Iraqi women singers